My Wife Is Formidable (French: Ma femme est formidable) is a 1951 French comedy film directed by André Hunebelle and  starring Fernand Gravey, Sophie Desmarets and Simone Valère. It was shot at the Saint-Maurice Studios in Paris. The film's sets were designed by the art director Lucien Carré.

Main cast 
 Fernand Gravey as Raymond Corbier (Sylvia's husband)
 Sophie Desmarets as Sylvia Corbier (Raymond's wife)
 Simone Valère as Marguerite Rival (Gaston's wife)
 Alfred Adam as Dr Gaston (Daisy's husband)
 Suzanne Dehelly as Sylvia's mother
 Jacques Dynam as Francis Germain (the trumpet player)
 Pauline Carton as the concierge
 Alan Adairas  Mr Hartley (the Englishman)
 Louis de Funès as the skier in search of a hotel room
 Pierre Destailles as the hotel porter
 Noël Roquevert as the hotel director
 Max Dalban as a furniture remover

See also
 My Husband Is Marvelous

References

Bibliography
 Rège, Philippe. Encyclopedia of French Film Directors, Volume 1. Scarecrow Press, 2009.

External links 
 
 Ma femme est formidable (1951) at the Films de France

1951 films
French comedy films
1950s French-language films
French black-and-white films
Films directed by André Hunebelle
1951 comedy films
Pathé films
Films with screenplays by Michel Audiard
1950s French films